The surname Pole usually derives from "Pool", a person associated with a body of water.

The Welsh de la Poles descended from Gruffydd ap Gwenwynwyn take their name from the previous association with the place Welshpool. The link between the knightly de la Poles of Wales (pre-1300), and William de la Pole (Chief Baron of the Exchequer), of Hull and his descendants, is uncertain and unproven. It is presented as fact in some genealogies (See Parentage of William de la Pole (d.1366)). Additionally some medieval contemporaries may have been unrelated to either family.

Pole
Sir Charles Pole, 1st Baronet (1757–1830), English naval officer and colonial governor
Dick Pole (born 1950), former Major League Baseball player and current coach
Edward Tudor-Pole (born 1955), a British singer and actor
Sir Felix Pole (1877–1956), British railway manager and industrialist
George Pole, Conservative Party (UK) member and activist, Chairman of the Conservative Monday Club 1970-1972
Sir Geoffrey Pole (1502–1558), Knight
Henry Pole, 1st Baron Montagu (c. 1492-1539)
Leon Pole (1871–1951), Australian artist
Margaret Pole, Countess of Salisbury, née of Clarence (1473–1541), daughter of George Plantagenet (brother of Edward IV and Richard III of England)
Reginald Pole (1500–1558), Cardinal, Archbishop of Canterbury
Richard Pole (disambiguation), the name of some prominent English noblemen
Ursula Pole, Baroness Stafford (c. 1504-1570), wife of Henry Stafford, 1st Baron Stafford
Wellesley Tudor Pole (1884–1964), English author
William Wellesley-Pole, 3rd Earl of Mornington, GCH, PC (1763–1845), British politician and elder brother of the Duke of Wellington
William Pole (1814–1900), English engineer

de la Pole
Alice de la Pole, née Chaucer (1404–1475), wife of William de la Pole, 1st Duke of Suffolk
Edmund de la Pole (disambiguation), the name of some prominent English noblemen
Griffith de la Pole (d. c. 1286), the English name of Welsh Gruffydd ap Gwenwynwyn
Joan Oldcastle, 4th Baroness Cobham, née de la Pole (d. 1433/1434)
John de la Pole (disambiguation), the name of some prominent English noblemen
Michael de la Pole (disambiguation), the name of some prominent English noblemen
Owen de la Pole (c. 1257 - c. 1293), 1st Lord of Powys, son of Griffith de la Pole
William de la Pole (disambiguation), the name of some prominent English noblemen

See also
Pole Baronets